The 1984 New Mexico State Aggies football team was an American football team that represented New Mexico State University in the Pacific Coast Athletic Association during the 1984 NCAA Division I-A football season. In their second year under head coach Fred Zechman, the Aggies compiled a 2–9 record. The team played its home games at Aggie Memorial Stadium in Las Cruces, New Mexico.

Schedule

Notes

References

New Mexico State
New Mexico State Aggies football seasons
New Mexico State Aggies football